The historicity of the Bible is the question of the Bible's relationship to history—covering not just the Bible's acceptability as history but also the ability to understand the literary forms of biblical narrative. One can extend biblical historicity to the evaluation of whether or not the Christian New Testament is an accurate record of the historical Jesus and of the Apostolic Age. This tends to vary depending upon the opinion of the scholar.

When studying the books of the Bible, scholars examine the historical context of passages, the importance ascribed to events by the authors, and the contrast between the descriptions of these events and other historical evidence. Being a collaborative, multigeneric work composed and redacted over the course of several centuries, the historicity of the Bible is not consistent throughout the entirety of its contents. 

According to theologian Thomas L. Thompson, a representative of the Copenhagen School, the archaeological record lends sparse and indirect evidence for the Old Testament's narratives as history. Others, like archeologist William G. Dever, feel that biblical archaeology has both confirmed and challenged the Old Testament stories. While Dever has criticized the Copenhagen School for its more radical approach, he is far from being a biblical literalist, and thinks that the purpose of biblical archaeology is not to simply support or discredit the biblical narrative, but to be a field of study in its own right.

Materials and methods

Manuscripts and canons
The Bible exists in multiple manuscripts, none of them an autograph, and multiple biblical canons, which do not completely agree on which books have sufficient authority to be included or their order. The early discussions about the exclusion or integration of various apocrypha involve an early idea about the historicity of the core. The Ionian Enlightenment influenced early patrons like Justin Martyr and Tertullian—both saw the biblical texts as being different from (and having more historicity than) the myths of other religions. Augustine was aware of the difference between science and scripture and defended the historicity of the biblical texts, e.g., against claims of Faustus of Mileve.

Historians hold that the Bible should not be treated differently from other historical (or literary) sources from the ancient world. One may compare doubts about the historicity of, for example, Herodotus; the consequence of these discussions is not that historians shall have to stop using ancient sources for historical reconstruction, but need to be aware of the problems involved when doing so.

Very few texts survive directly from antiquity: most have been copied—some, many times. To determine the accuracy of a copied manuscript, textual critics examine the way the transcripts have passed through history to their extant forms. The higher the consistency of the earliest texts, the greater their textual reliability, and the less chance that the content has been changed over the years. Multiple copies may also be grouped into text types, with some types judged closer to the hypothetical original than others.

Writing and reading history

The meaning of the term "history" is itself dependent on social and historical context. Paula McNutt, for instance, notes that the Old Testament narratives

Even from the earliest times, students of religious texts had an awareness that parts of the scriptures could not be interpreted as a strictly consistent sequence of events. The Talmud cites a dictum ascribed to the third-century teacher Abba Arika that "there is no chronological order in the Torah". Examples were often presented and discussed in later Jewish exegesis with, according to Abraham Joshua Heschel (1907-1972), an ongoing discourse between those who would follow the views of Rabbi Ishmael (born 90 CE) that "the Torah speaks in human language", compared to the more mystical approach of Rabbi Akiva ( 50 – 135 CE) that any such deviations should signpost some deeper order or purpose, to be divined.

During the modern era, the focus of biblical history has also diversified. The project of biblical archaeology associated with W.F. Albright (1891-1971), which sought to validate the historicity of the events narrated in the Bible through the ancient texts and material remains of the Near East, has a more specific focus compared to the more expansive view of history described by archaeologist William Dever (1933- ). In discussing the role of his discipline in interpreting the biblical record, Dever has pointed to multiple histories within the Bible, including the history of theology (the relationship between God and believers), political history (usually the account of "Great Men"), narrative history (the chronology of events), intellectual history (treating ideas and their development, context and evolution), socio-cultural history (institutions, including their social underpinnings in family, clan, tribe and social class and the state), cultural history (overall cultural evolution, demography, socio-economic and political structure and ethnicity), technological history (the techniques by which humans adapt to, exploit and make use of the resources of their environment), natural history (how humans discover and adapt to the ecological facts of their natural environment), and material history (artifacts as correlates of changes in human behaviour).

Sharply differing perspectives on the relationship between narrative history and theological meaning present a special challenge for assessing the historicity of the Bible. Supporters of biblical literalism "deny that Biblical infallibility and inerrancy are limited to spiritual, religious, or redemptive themes, exclusive of assertions in the fields of history and science. We further deny that scientific hypotheses about earth history may properly be used to overturn the teaching of Scripture on creation and the flood." "History", or specifically biblical history, in this context appears to mean a definitive and finalized framework of events and actions—comfortingly familiar shared facts—like an omniscient medieval chronicle, shorn of alternative accounts, psychological interpretations, or literary pretensions. But prominent scholars have expressed diametrically opposing views: 
[T]he stories about the promise given to the patriarchs in Genesis are not historical, nor do they intend to be historical; they are rather historically determined expressions about Israel and Israel's relationship to its God, given in forms legitimate to their time, and their truth lies not in their facticity, nor in the historicity, but their ability to express the reality that Israel experienced.
Modern professional historians, familiar with the phenomenon of on-going historical revisionism, allow new findings and ideas into their interpretations of "what happened", and scholars versed in the study of texts (however sacred) see all narrators as potentially unreliable
and all accounts—especially edited accounts—as potentially historically incomplete, biased by times and circumstances.

Hebrew Bible/Old Testament

Authorship

A central pillar of the Bible's historical authority was the tradition that it had been composed by the principal actors or eyewitnesses to the events described—the Pentateuch was the work of Moses, the Book of Joshua was by Joshua, and so on. However, the Protestant Reformation had brought the actual texts to a much wider audience, which combined with the growing climate of intellectual ferment in the 17th century that was the start of the Age of Enlightenment. This threw a harsh, sceptical spotlight on these traditional claims. In Protestant England, the philosopher Thomas Hobbes in his major work Leviathan (1651) denied Mosaic authorship of the Pentateuch, and identified Joshua, Judges, Samuel, Kings, and Chronicles as having been written long after the events they purported to describe. His conclusions rested on internal textual evidence, but in an argument that resonates with modern debates, he noted: "Who were the original writers of the several Books of Holy Scripture, has not been made evident by any sufficient testimony of other History, which is the only proof of matter of fact."

The Jewish philosopher and pantheist Baruch Spinoza echoed Hobbes's doubts about the provenance of the historical books in his Tractatus Theologico-Politicus (published in 1670), and elaborated on the suggestion that the final redaction of these texts was post-exilic under the auspices of Ezra (Chapter IX). He had earlier been effectively excommunicated by the rabbinical council of Amsterdam for his perceived heresies. The French priest Richard Simon brought these critical perspectives to the Catholic tradition in 1678, observing "the most part of the Holy Scriptures that are come to us, are but Abridgments and as Summaries of ancient Acts which were kept in the Registries of the Hebrews," in what was probably the first work of biblical textual criticism in the modern sense.

In response Jean Astruc, applying to the Pentateuch source criticism methods common in the analysis of classical secular texts, believed he could detect four different manuscript traditions, which he claimed Moses himself had redacted (p. 62–64). His 1753 book initiated the school known as higher criticism that culminated in Julius Wellhausen formalising the documentary hypothesis in the 1870s, which identifies these narratives as the Jahwist, Elohist, Deuteronomist, and the Priestly source. While versions of the documentary hypothesis vary in the order in which they were composed, the circumstances of their composition, and the date of their redaction(s), their shared terminology continues to provide the framework for modern theories on the composite nature and origins of the Torah.

By the end of the 19th century the scholarly consensus was that the Pentateuch was the work of many authors writing from 1000 BCE (the time of David) to 500 BCE (the time of Ezra) and redacted c. 450, and as a consequence whatever history it contained was more often polemical than strictly factual—a conclusion reinforced by the then fresh scientific refutations of what were at the time widely classed as biblical mythologies.

Torah (Pentateuch)

Genesis creation narrative

There is a Christian tradition of criticism of the creation narratives in Genesis dating back to at least St Augustine of Hippo (354–430), and Jewish tradition has also maintained a critical thread in its approach to biblical primeval history. The influential medieval philosopher Maimonides maintained a skeptical ambiguity toward creation ex nihilo and considered the stories about Adam more as "philosophical anthropology, rather than as historical stories whose protagonist is the 'first man'." Greek philosophers Aristotle, Critolaus and Proclus held that the world was eternal. Such interpretations are inconsistent with what was after the Protestant Reformation to be "commonly perceived in evangelicalism as traditional views of Genesis".

The publication of James Hutton's Theory of the Earth in 1788 was an important development in the scientific revolution that would dethrone Genesis as the ultimate authority on primeval earth and prehistory. The first casualty was the Creation story itself, and by the early 19th century "no responsible scientist contended for the literal credibility of the Mosaic account of creation." The battle between uniformitarianism and catastrophism kept the flood alive in the emerging discipline, until Adam Sedgwick, the president of the Geological Society, publicly recanted his previous support in his 1831 presidential address:
We ought indeed to have paused before we first adopted the diluvian theory, and referred all our old superficial gravel to the action of the Mosaic Flood. For of man, and the works of his hands, we have not yet found a single trace among the remnants of the former world entombed in those deposits.

All of which left the "first man" and his putative descendants in the awkward position of being stripped of all historical context, until Charles Darwin naturalized the Garden of Eden with the publication of On the Origin of Species in 1859. Public acceptance of this scientific revolution was, at the time, uneven, but has since grown significantly. The mainstream scholarly community soon arrived at a consensus, which holds today, that Genesis 1–11 is a highly schematic literary work representing theology/symbolic mythology rather than actual history or science.

The Patriarchs

In the following decades Hermann Gunkel drew attention to the mythic aspects of the Pentateuch, and Albrecht Alt, Martin Noth and the tradition history school argued that although its core traditions had genuinely ancient roots, the narratives were fictional framing devices and were not intended as history in the modern sense. Though doubts have been cast on the historiographic reconstructions of this school (particularly the notion of oral traditions as a primary ancient source), much of its critique of biblical historicity found wide acceptance. Gunkel's position is that
 This has in various forms become a commonplace of contemporary criticism.

In the United States the biblical archaeology movement, under the influence of Albright, counterattacked, arguing that the broad outline within the framing narratives was also true, so that while scholars could not realistically expect to prove or disprove individual episodes from the life of Abraham and the other patriarchs, these were real individuals who could be placed in a context proven from the archaeological record. But as more discoveries were made, and anticipated finds failed to materialise, it became apparent that archaeology did not in fact support the claims made by Albright and his followers.

Following Albright's death, his interpretation of the patriarchal age came under increasing criticism: such dissatisfaction marked its culmination with the publication of The Historicity of the Patriarchal Narratives by Thomas L. Thompson and Abraham in History and Tradition by John Van Seters. Thompson, a literary scholar, argued on the lack of compelling evidence that the patriarchs lived in the 2nd millennium BCE, and noted how certain biblical texts reflected first millennium conditions and concerns, while Van Seters examined the patriarchal stories and argued that their names, social milieu, and messages strongly suggested that they were Iron Age creations. Van Seter and Thompson's works were a paradigm shift in biblical scholarship and archaeology, which gradually led scholars to no longer consider the patriarchal narratives as historical. Some conservative scholars attempted to defend the patriarchal narratives in the following years, but this position has not found acceptance among scholars.

Today, only a minority of scholars continue to work within this framework, mainly for reasons of religious conviction. William Dever stated in 1993 that

The Exodus 

Mainstream scholarship no longer accepts the biblical Exodus account as history for a number of reasons. Most scholars agree that the Exodus stories reached the current form centuries after the apparent setting of the stories. The Book of Exodus itself attempts to ground the event firmly in history, dating the exodus to the 2666th year after creation (Exodus 12:40-41), the construction of the tabernacle to year 2667 (Exodus 40:1-2, 17), stating that the Israelites dwelled in Egypt for 430 years (Exodus 12:40-41), and including place names such as Goshen (Gen. 46:28), Pithom and Ramesses (Exod. 1:11), as well as stating that 600,000 Israelite men were involved (Exodus 12:37). The Book of Numbers further states that the number of Israelites in the desert during the wandering were 603,550, including 22,273 first-borns, which modern estimates put at 2.5-3 million total Israelites, a clearly fanciful number that could never have been supported by the Sinai Desert. The geography is vague with regions such as Goshen unidentified, and there are internal problems with dating in the Pentateuch.  No modern attempt to identify a historical Egyptian prototype for Moses has found wide acceptance, and no period in Egyptian history matches the biblical accounts of the Exodus. Some elements of the story are miraculous and defy rational explanation, such as the Plagues of Egypt and the Crossing of the Red Sea. The Bible also fails to mention the names of any of the pharaohs involved in the Exodus narrative.

While ancient Egyptian texts from the New Kingdom mention "Asiatics" living in Egypt as slaves and workers, these people cannot be securely connected to the Israelites, and no contemporary Egyptian text mentions a large-scale exodus of slaves like that described in the Bible. The earliest surviving historical mention of the Israelites, the Egyptian Merneptah Stele (c. 1207 BCE), appears to place them in or around Canaan and gives no indication of any exodus.

Despite the absence of any archaeological evidence, a majority of scholars agree that the Exodus probably has some historical basis, with Kenton Sparks referring to it as "mythologized history." Scholars posit that small groups of people of Egyptian origin may have joined the early Israelites, and then contributed their own Egyptian Exodus story to all of Israel. William G. Dever cautiously identifies this group with the Tribe of Joseph, while Richard Elliott Friedman identifies it with the Tribe of Levi.  Most scholars who accept a historical core of the exodus date this possible exodus group to the thirteenth century BCE at the time of Ramses II, with some instead dating it to the twelfth century BCE at the time of Ramses III. Evidence in favor of historical traditions forming a background to the Exodus narrative include the documented movements of small groups of Ancient Semitic-speaking peoples into and out of Egypt during the Eighteenth and Nineteenth Dynasties, some elements of Egyptian folklore and culture in the Exodus narrative, and the names Moses, Aaron and Phinehas, which seem to have an Egyptian origin. Scholarly estimates for how many people could have been involved in such an exodus range from a few hundred to a few thousand people.

Deuteronomistic history

Many scholars believe that the Deuteronomistic history preserved elements of ancient texts and oral tradition, including geo-political and socio-economic realities and certain information about historical figures and events. However, large portions of it are legendary and it contains many anachronisms.

The "conquest narrative" in Joshua and Judges

A major issue in the historicity debate was the narrative of the Israelite conquest of Canaan, described in Joshua and Judges. The American Albright school asserted that the biblical narrative of conquest would be affirmed by archaeological record; and indeed for much of the 20th century archaeology appeared to support the biblical narrative, including excavations at Beitin (identified as Bethel), Tel ed-Duweir, (identified as Lachish), Hazor, and Jericho.

However, flaws in the conquest narrative appeared. The most high-profile example was the "fall of Jericho", excavated by John Garstang in the 1930s. Garstang originally announced that he had found fallen walls dating to the time of the biblical Battle of Jericho, but later revised the destruction to a much earlier period. Kathleen Kenyon dated the destruction of the walled city to the middle of the 16th century ( 1550 BCE), too early to match the usual dating of the Exodus to Pharaoh Ramses, on the basis of her excavations in the early 1950s. The same conclusion, based on an analysis of all the excavation findings, was reached by Piotr Bienkowski. By the 1960s it had become clear that the archaeological record did not, in fact, support the account of the conquest given in Joshua: the cities which the Bible records as having been destroyed by the Israelites were either uninhabited at the time, or, if destroyed, were destroyed at widely different times, not in one brief period.
The consensus for the conquest narrative was eventually abandoned in the late 20th century.

Peake's Commentary on the Bible argues that the Book of Joshua conflates several independent battles between disparate groups over the centuries, and artificially attributes them to a single leader, Joshua. However, there are a few cases where the biblical record is not contradicted by the archaeological record. For example, stratum in Tel Hazor, found in a destruction layer from around 1200 BCE, shows signs of catastrophic fire, and cuneiform tablets found at the site refer to monarchs named Ibni Addi, where Ibni may be the etymological origin of Yavin (Jabin), the Canaanite leader referred to in the Hebrew Bible. The city also shows signs of having been a magnificent Canaanite city prior to its destruction, with great temples and opulent palaces, split into an upper acropolis and lower city; the town evidently had been a major Canaanite city. Israel Finkelstein theorized that the destruction of Hazor was the result of civil strife, attacks by the Sea Peoples, and/or a result of the general collapse of civilization across the whole eastern Mediterranean in the Late Bronze Age, rather than being caused by the Israelites.

Amnon Ben-Tor (Hebrew University of Jerusalem) believes that recently unearthed evidence of violent destruction by burning verifies the biblical account. In 2012, a team led by Ben-Tor and Sharon Zuckerman discovered a scorched palace from the 13th century BC in whose storerooms they found 3,400-year-old ewers holding burned crops; however, Sharon Zuckerman did not agree with Ben-Tor's theory, and claimed that the burning was the result of the city's numerous factions opposing each other with excessive force. Biblical scholar Richard Elliot Friedman (University of Georgia) argues that the Israelites did destroy Hazor, but that such destruction fits better with the account of the Book of Judges, in which the prophetess Deborah defeats the king of Hazor.

Books of Samuel

The Books of Samuel are considered to be based on both historical and legendary sources, primarily serving to fill the gap in Israelite history after the events described in Deuteronomy. The battles involving the destruction of the Canaanites are not supported by archaeological record, and it is now widely believed that the Israelites themselves originated as a sub-group of Canaanites. The Books of Samuel exhibit too many anachronisms to have been compiled in the 11th century BCE. For example, there is mention of later armor (1 Samuel 17:4–7, 38–39; 25:13), use of camels (1 Samuel 30:17), and cavalry (as distinct from chariotry) (1 Samuel 13:5, 2 Samuel 1:6), iron picks and axes (as though they were common) (2 Samuel 12:31), sophisticated siege techniques (2 Samuel 20:15). There is a gargantuan troop called up (2 Samuel 17:1), a battle with 20,000 casualties (2 Samuel 18:7), and a reference to Kushite paramilitary and servants, clearly giving evidence of a date in which Kushites were common, after the 26th Dynasty of Egypt, the period of the last quarter of the 8th century BCE.

United Monarchy

Much of the focus of modern criticism has been the historicity of the United Monarchy of Israel, which according to the Hebrew Bible ruled over both Judea and Samaria around the 10th century BCE.
Thomas L. Thompson, a leading minimalist scholar for example, has written:

There is no evidence of a United Monarchy, no evidence of a capital in Jerusalem or of any coherent, unified political force that dominated western Palestine, let alone an empire of the size the legends describe. We do not have evidence for the existence of kings named Saul, David or Solomon; nor do we have evidence for any temple at Jerusalem in this early period. What we do know of Israel and Judah of the tenth century does not allow us to interpret this lack of evidence as a gap in our knowledge and information about the past, a result merely of the accidental nature of archeology. There is neither room nor context, no artifact or archive that points to such historical realities in Palestine's tenth century. One cannot speak historically of a state without a population. Nor can one speak of a capital without a town. Stories are not enough.

In Iron Age IIa (corresponding to the Monarchal period) Judah seems to have been limited to small, mostly rural and unfortified settlements in the Judean hills. This contrasts to the upper Samaria which was becoming urbanized. This archaeological evidence as well as textual criticism has led many modern historians to treat Israel/Samaria and Judah as arising separately as distinct albeit related entities centered at Shechem and Jerusalem, respectively, and not as a united kingdom with a capital in Jerusalem.

Excavations at Khirbet Qeiyafa, an Iron Age site located in Judah, support the biblical account of a United Monarchy. The Israel Antiquities Authority stated: "The excavations at Khirbat Qeiyafa clearly reveal an urban society that existed in Judah already in the late eleventh century BCE. It can no longer be argued that the Kingdom of Judah developed only in the late eighth century BCE or at some other later date."

The status of Jerusalem in the 10th century BCE is a major subject of debate. The oldest part of Jerusalem and its original urban core is the City of David, which does not show evidence of significant Judean residential activity until the 9th century. However, unique administrative structures such as the Stepped Stone Structure and the Large Stone Structure, which originally formed one structure, contain material culture dated to Iron I. On account of the apparent lack of settlement activity in the 10th century BCE, Israel Finkelstein argues that Jerusalem in the century was a small country village in the Judean hills, not a national capital, and Ussishkin argues that the city was entirely uninhabited. Amihai Mazar contends that if the Iron I/Iron IIa dating of administrative structures in the City of David are correct (as he believes), "Jerusalem was a rather small town with a mighty citadel, which could have been a center of a substantial regional polity."

Since Jerusalem has been destroyed and then subsequently rebuilt approximately 15 to 20 times since the time of David and Solomon, some argue much of the evidence of 10th century habitation could easily have been eliminated. However, Israel Finkelstein notes that significant architecture from later in the Iron Age (Iron IIb) has been found.

Since the discovery of the Tel Dan Stele dated to the 9th or 8th century BCE containing bytdwd, interpreted by some as a reference to the "House of David" as a monarchic dynasty in Judah (another possible reference occurs in the Mesha Stele), the majority of scholars accept the existence of a polity ruled by David and Solomon, albeit on a more modest scale than described in the Bible. Most scholars believe that David and Solomon reigned over large sections of Cisjordan and probably parts of Transjordan. William G. Dever argues that David only reigned over the current territories of Israel and West Bank and that he did defeat the invading Philistines, but that the other conquests are fictitious.

New Testament

Historicity of Jesus

The majority of modern scholars of antiquity agree that Jesus existed historically, that he was baptized by John the Baptist and crucified by order of Roman prefect Pontius Pilate. The "quest for the historical Jesus" began as early as the 18th century, and has continued to this day. The most notable recent scholarship came in the 1980s and 1990s, with the work of J. D. Crossan, James D. G. Dunn, John P. Meier, E. P. Sanders and N. T. Wright being the most widely read and discussed. Other works on the matter were published by Dale Allison, Bart D. Ehrman, Richard Bauckham and Maurice Casey.

The earliest New Testament texts which refer to Jesus, the Pauline epistles, are usually dated in the 50s CE. Since Paul records very little of Jesus' life and activities, these are of little help in determining facts about the life of Jesus, although they may contain references to information given to Paul from the eyewitnesses of Jesus.

The discovery of the Dead Sea Scrolls has shed light into the context of 1st century Judea, noting the diversity of Jewish belief as well as shared expectations and teachings. For example, the expectation of the coming messiah, the beatitudes of the Sermon on the Mount and much else of the early Christian movement are found to have existed within apocalyptic Judaism of the period. This has had the effect of centering Early Christianity much more within its Jewish roots than was previously the case. It is now recognised that Rabbinic Judaism and Early Christianity are only two of the many strands which survived until the Jewish revolt of 66 to 70 CE.

Most historical critics agree that a historical figure named Jesus taught throughout the Galilean countryside c. 30 CE, was believed by his followers to have performed supernatural acts, and was sentenced to death by the Romans, possibly for insurrection.

Historicity of the Gospels

Most modern scholars hold that the canonical gospel accounts were written between 70 and 100, four to eight decades after the crucifixion, although based on earlier traditions and texts, such as "Q", Logia or sayings gospels, the passion account or other earlier literature (See List of Gospels). Some scholars argue that these accounts were compiled by witnesses although this view is disputed by other scholars.

Some scholars believe that the Gospel of Mark shows signs of a lack of knowledge of geographical, political and religious matters in Judea in the time of Jesus. Thus, today the most common opinion is that the author is unknown and both geographically and historically at a distance from the narrated events; however, opinion varies, and scholars such as Craig Blomberg accept the more traditional view. The use of expressions that may be described as awkward and rustic cause the Gospel of Mark to appear somewhat unlettered or even crude. This may be attributed to the influence that Saint Peter, a fisherman, is suggested to have on the writing of Mark. It is commonly thought that the writers of the Gospel of Matthew and Gospel of Luke used Mark as a source, with changes and improvement to peculiarities and crudities in Mark.

Historicity of Acts

Archaeological inscriptions and other independent sources show that Acts contains some accurate details of 1st century society with regard to titles of officials, administrative divisions, town assemblies, and rules of the Jewish temple in Jerusalem. However, the historicity of the depiction of Paul the Apostle in Acts is contested. Acts describes Paul differently from how Paul describes himself, both factually and theologically. Acts differs from Paul's letters on important issues, such as the Law, Paul's own apostleship, and his relation to the Jerusalem church. Scholars generally prefer Paul's account over that in Acts.

Schools of archaeological and historical thought

Overview of academic views

According to Spencer Mizen of BBC History Magazine, "The origins of the Bible are still cloaked in mystery. When was it written? Who wrote it? And how reliable is it as an historical record?"
An educated reading of the biblical text requires knowledge of when it was written, by whom, and for what purpose. For example, many academics would agree that the Pentateuch was in existence some time shortly after the 6th century BCE, but they disagree about when it was written. Proposed dates vary from the 15th century BCE to the 6th century BCE. One popular hypothesis points to the reign of Josiah (7th century BCE). In this hypothesis, the events of, for example, Exodus would have happened centuries before they were finally edited.

The documentary hypothesis claims, using the biblical evidence itself, to demonstrate that the current version of the Bible is based on older written sources that are lost. It has been modified heavily over the years, and some scholars accept some form of this hypothesis. There have also been and are a number of scholars who reject it, for example Egyptologist Kenneth Kitchen and Old Testament scholar Walter Kaiser, Jr., as well as R. N. Whybray, Umberto Cassuto, O. T. Allis, Gleason Archer, John Sailhamer, Bruce Waltke, and Joshua Berman.

Maximalist–minimalist dichotomy
There is great scholarly controversy on the historicity of events recounted in the biblical narratives prior to the Babylonian captivity in the 6th century BCE. There is a split between scholars who reject the biblical account of Ancient Israel as fundamentally ahistorical, and those who accept it as a largely reliable source of history—termed biblical minimalists and biblical maximalists, respectively. The major split of biblical scholarship into two opposing schools is strongly disapproved by non-fundamentalist biblical scholars, as being an attempt by conservative Christians to portray the field as a bipolar argument, of which only one side is correct.

Recently the difference between the Maximalist and Minimalist has reduced, and a new school started with a work, The Quest for the Historical Israel: Debating Archaeology and the History of Early Israel by Israel Finkelstein, Amihai Mazar, and Brian B. Schmidt. This school argues that post-processual archaeology enables us to recognize the existence of a middle ground between minimalism and maximalism, and that both these extremes need to be rejected. Archaeology offers both confirmation of parts of the biblical record and also poses challenges to the interpretations made by some. The careful examination of the evidence demonstrates that the historical accuracy of the first part of the Old Testament is greatest during the reign of Josiah. Some feel that the accuracy diminishes the further backwards one proceeds from this date. This, they claim, would confirm that a major redaction of the texts seems to have occurred at about that date.

Biblical minimalism

The viewpoint sometimes called biblical minimalism generally holds that the Bible is principally a theological and apologetic work, and all stories within it are of an aetiological character. The early stories are held to have a historical basis that was reconstructed centuries later, and the stories possess at most only a few tiny fragments of genuine historical memory, which by their definition are only those points which are supported by archaeological discoveries. In this view, all of the stories about the biblical patriarchs are fictional, and the patriarchs mere legendary eponyms to describe later historical realities. Further, biblical minimalists hold that the twelve tribes of Israel were a later construction, the stories of King David and King Saul were modeled upon later Irano-Hellenistic examples, and that there is no archaeological evidence that the united Kingdom of Israel—where the Bible says that David and Solomon ruled over an empire from the Euphrates to Eilath—ever existed. Archaeological evidence suggesting otherwise, such as the Mesha Stele, is often rejected as allegorical.

It is hard to pinpoint when the movement started but 1968 seems to be a reasonable date. During this year, two prize-winning essays were written in Copenhagen; one by Niels Peter Lemche, the other by Heike Friis, which advocated a complete rethinking of the way we approach the Bible and attempt to draw historical conclusions from it.

In published books, one of the early advocates of the current school of thought known as biblical minimalism is Giovanni Garbini,  (1986), translated into English as History and Ideology in Ancient Israel (1988). In his footsteps followed Thomas L. Thompson with his lengthy Early History of the Israelite People: From the Written & Archaeological Sources (1992) and, building explicitly on Thompson's book, P. R. Davies' shorter work, In Search of 'Ancient Israel''' (1992). In the latter, Davies finds historical Israel only in archaeological remains, biblical Israel only in scripture, and recent reconstructions of "ancient Israel" to be an unacceptable amalgam of the two. Thompson and Davies see the entire Hebrew Bible (Old Testament) as the imaginative creation of a small community of Jews at Jerusalem during the period which the Bible assigns to after the return from the Babylonian exile, from 539 BCE onward. Niels Peter Lemche, Thompson's fellow faculty member at the University of Copenhagen, also followed with several titles that show Thompson's influence, including The Israelites in history and tradition (1998). The presence of both Thompson and Lemche at the same institution has led to the use of the term "Copenhagen school". The effect of biblical minimalism from 1992 onward was debate with more than two points of view.

Biblical maximalism

There is great scholarly controversy on the historicity particularly of those events recounted in the biblical narratives prior to the Babylonian captivity in the 6th century BCE. Regarding the debate over the historicity of ancient Israel, the maximalist position holds that the accounts of the United Monarchy and the early kings of Israel, David and Saul, are to be taken as largely historical.

Decreasing conflict
In 2001, Israel Finkelstein and Neil Asher Silberman published The Bible Unearthed: Archaeology's New Vision of Ancient Israel and the Origin of Its Sacred Texts which advocated a view midway toward biblical minimalism and caused an uproar among many conservatives. In the 25th anniversary issue of Biblical Archaeology Review (March/April 2001 edition), editor Hershel Shanks quoted several biblical scholars who insisted that minimalism was dying, although leading minimalists deny this and a claim has been made "We are all minimalists now" (an allusion to "We are all Keynesians now").

In 2003, Kenneth Kitchen, a scholar who adopts a more maximalist point of view, authored the book On the Reliability of the Old Testament. Kitchen advocated the reliability of many (although not all) parts of the Torah and in no uncertain terms criticizes the work of Finkelstein and Silberman, to which Finkelstein has since responded.

Jennifer Wallace describes archaeologist Israel Finkelstein's view in her article "Shifting Ground in the Holy Land", appearing in Smithsonian Magazine, May 2006:

However, despite problems with the archaeological record, some maximalists place Joshua in the mid-second millennium, at about the time the Egyptian Empire came to rule over Canaan, and not the 13th century as Finkelstein or Kitchen claim, and view the destruction layers of the period as corroboration of the biblical account. The destruction of Hazor in the mid-13th century is seen as corroboration of the biblical account of the later destruction carried out by Deborah and Barak as recorded in the Book of Judges. The location that Finkelstein refers to as "Ai" is generally dismissed as the location of the biblical Ai, since it was destroyed and buried in the 3rd millennium. The prominent site has been known by that name since at least Hellenistic times, if not before. Minimalists all hold that dating these events as contemporary are etiological explanations written centuries after the events they claim to report.

Both Finkelstein and Silberman do accept that David and Solomon were really existing persons (not kings but bandit leaders or hill country chieftains)Richard N. Ostling Was King David legend or fiction?  The Associated Press from Judah about the 10th century BCE, but they do not assume that there was such a thing as United Monarchy with a capital in Jerusalem.

Others, such as David Ussishkin, argue that those who follow the biblical depiction of a United Monarchy do so on the basis of limited evidence while hoping to uncover real archaeological proof in the future. Gunnar Lehmann suggests that there is still a possibility that David and Solomon were able to become local chieftains of some importance and claims that Jerusalem at the time was at best a small town in a sparsely populated area in which alliances of tribal kinship groups formed the basis of society. He goes on further to claim that it was at best a small regional centre, one of three to four in the territory of Judah and neither David nor Solomon had the manpower or the requisite social/political/administrative structure to rule the kind of empire described in the Bible.

These views are strongly criticized by William G. Dever, Helga Weippert, Amihai Mazar and Amnon Ben-Tor.

André Lemaire states in Ancient Israel: From Abraham to the Roman Destruction of the Temple that the principal points of the biblical tradition with Solomon are generally trustworthy. Kenneth Kitchen shares this view, arguing that Solomon ruled over a comparatively wealthy "mini-empire", rather than a small city-state.

Recently, Finkelstein has joined with the more conservative Amihai Mazar to explore the areas of agreement and disagreement and there are signs the intensity of the debate between the so-called minimalist and maximalist scholars is diminishing. This view is also taken by Richard S. Hess, which shows there is in fact a plurality of views between maximalists and minimalists. Jack Cargill has shown that popular textbooks not only fail to give readers up-to-date archaeological evidence, but that they also fail to correctly represent the diversity of views present on the subject. Megan Bishop Moore and Brad E. Kelle provide an overview of the respective evolving approaches and attendant controversies, especially during the period from the mid-1980s through 2011, in their book Biblical History and Israel's Past''.

See also

 Academic view of Ezra
 Biblical archaeology school
 Biblical criticism
 Biblical inerrancy
 Rudolf Bultmann
 Census of Quirinius
 Chronology of Jesus
 Composition of the Book of Daniel
 Crucifixion darkness
 Development of the New Testament canon
 Flood geology
 Historical Jesus
 Historicity of Abraham
 Historicity of Esther
 Historicity of Joshua
 Historicity of King David
 Historicity of Moses
 Historicity of the Exodus
 Historicity of the Massacre of the Innocents
 Historicity of the United Monarchy
 Sanhedrin trial of Jesus
 Theudas

Notes

References

Citations

Sources 

 
 
 
 
  
 
 
 
  
 
 
 
 
 
  — a translation of the original Italian publication.
 
 
  
 
 
 
 
 
 
 
 
   —  In which the relevant section is "Toward a Balanced View of Minimalism: A Summary of Published Critiques", the Official version of record is available at Strengthening Biblical Historicity vis-à-vis Minimalism, 1992–2008 and Beyond, Part 2.1: The Literature of Perspective, Critique, and Methodology, First Half . Author's Accepted Draft if freely available at Strengthening Biblical Historicity vis-à-vis Minimalism, 1992-2008 and Beyond, Part 2.1: The Literature of Perspective, Critique, and Methodology, First Half.

Further reading 

 
 
 
 
 
 
 
 
 
 
 
 
 
 
 
 
 
 
 
  — also "The Chronicler's History", Sheffield, 1987.
  — a critique of the Copenhagen School of Thought - with responses in the same journal by Davies (above) and Thompson (1995 see below)
 
 
 
 
  — This article presents a debate between a Biblical minimalist and a Biblical maximalist.
  — a response to the article by Iain W. Provan(1995– above)

External links 
 'Minimalism' – The Copenhagen School of Thought in Biblical Studies 
 Biblical Archaeology Society: examines discoveries and controversies about historical veracity of the Bible
 Livius.org: Maximalism and minimalism

 
Ancient Jewish history
Biblical criticism